{|
|}
The Wittemann-Lewis NBL-1 "Barling Bomber" was an experimental long-range, heavy bomber built for the United States Army Air Service in the early 1920s. Although unsuccessful, it was an early attempt at creating a strategic bomber.

Design and development
Development of the XNBL-1 (Experimental Night Bomber, Long Range) Barling Bomber is generally attributed (the press called it "Mitchell's Folly") to William "Billy" Mitchell, a U.S.Army Air Service General and most vocal advocate of strategic airpower, who in 1919 discovered Walter H. Barling, who had previously worked for the Royal Aircraft Factory. Mitchell asked Barling to design a bomber capable of carrying enough bombs to sink a battleship. Mitchell's goal was to demonstrate the effectiveness of airpower by sinking a battleship from the air, and needed a large, strategic bomber in order to accomplish this feat. Mitchell projected the cost of two prototype bombers at $375,000.

Barling had previously designed the Tarrant Tabor, which was similar in concept but was destroyed in a fatal nose-over crash on its first flight in 1919. The nose-over had probably been caused by the high placement of two of the six engines – a compromise due to the lack of more powerful engines. Like the Tabor, the Barling Bomber was a large six-engined triplane with a cigar-shaped fuselage. Unlike its predecessor, the Barling had all of its engines mounted level with the fuselage. The aircraft used three wings, but was not actually a triplane in the conventional sense. More correctly, it was a two-and-a-half wing aircraft. The middle wing had no control surfaces, and was shorter and narrower than the two primary wings. The undercarriage consisted of 10 wheels, including two wheels mounted towards the front of the aircraft (to prevent a nose-over on takeoff) and a tail skid.

The Engineering Division was forced to use Liberty engines because of an abundant supply of the engines. To power the Barling, four 420 hp Liberty engines were mounted between the lower and middle wings in a tractor arrangement, and an additional two in a pusher position. The gross weight of the bomber was 42,569 lb. It had a fuel capacity of 2,000 gallons, and carried 181 gallons of oil.

Two pilots occupied separate cockpits either side of the fuselage, while a bombardier sat in the nose. One or two flight engineers sat behind the cockpits to help tend the engines. A radio operator and a navigator were seated next to them.

The Barling was armed with seven .30-caliber Lewis machine guns, which were operated from five stations. The gun stations gave the gunners a field of fire that covered practically the whole area around the bomber. Bomb racks were mounted in an enclosed bomb bay beneath the gasoline tanks. The bomb bay could accommodate any bomb in the air service inventory, including the 2,000- and 4,000-lb bombs that had been designed specifically to sink a battleship. The Barling incorporated bomb bay doors on the bottom of the fuselage, one of the first aircraft to feature such an innovation.

Production
The winning bid for construction of the massive bomber went to the Wittemann-Lewis Company of Hasbrouck Heights, New Jersey. They received a contract to construct two aircraft at a cost of $375,000. Due to increased costs and the number of design changes required, the order was cut to one. By the time the aircraft was completed in October 1922, the cost had risen from $375,000 for two bombers to $525,000 for one.

Wittemann-Lewis had to absorb the cost overrun, and went out of business a few months after shipping the completed aircraft to Ohio.

There were only six airfields in the country large enough to accommodate the massive bomber, and after careful consideration the decision was made to base it at Wilbur Wright Field in Fairborn, Ohio (then known as Fairfield) because of its close proximity to McCook Field, and its resources. The bomber was shipped by rail to Wilbur Wright Field in Fairfield, Ohio in May 1923. After 94 days of assembly, the aircraft was ready for its maiden flight.

Operational history

On 22 August 1923, the Barling Bomber made its maiden flight from Wilbur Wright Field in Fairfield, Ohio. At the time, it was comparable in size to the German Riesenflugzeug and Italian Caproni Ca.4 heavy bombers and remains large even by today's standards, however it was severely overbuilt and weighed significantly more than other aircraft at the time of a similar size, to the detriment of its performance.

On its first flight, it was piloted by Lt. Harold R. Harris, and Lt. Muir S. Fairchild, future U.S. Air Force Vice Chief of Staff. The flight engineer was Douglas Culver. Barling flew along as a passenger. Critics had claimed that the bomber would roll all the way to Dayton before it ever took off, but the aircraft became airborne after a 13-second,  takeoff run.

On 3 October 1924, the aircraft set a duration record of 1 hour 47 minutes for an aircraft "with 8,820 lbs (4,000 kgs [sic]) useful load". It also set a record in the same class for altitude with 4,470 ft (1,363 m).

Although capable of carrying a  bomb load, it was soon discovered that the aircraft was seriously underpowered, and performance was disappointing. The overly complex structure of three wings and their accompanying struts and bracing wires created so much drag that the six engines couldn't compensate. On a flight from Dayton, Ohio to a scheduled appearance at an airshow in Washington, DC, the Barling Bomber failed to achieve enough height to get over the Appalachian Mountains and had to turn around.

A problem with water collecting in the aircraft's wings during rainstorms necessitated the construction of a special hangar at a cost of $700,000. The hangar was constructed in 1925 at the nearby Fairfield Air Depot.

Although the XNBL-1 was not put into production, it had advanced features such as aluminum fuselage components, adjustable multi-wheel undercarriage, separate compartments for crew, a flight engineer, electrical instruments and advanced engine controls. One unusual feature was that the incidence of the tailplane could be adjusted in flight using a lever in the cockpit. The XNBL-1 was the largest aircraft built in the United States until the Boeing XB-15 in 1935.

Frequently characterized by opponents of airpower as "Mitchell’s Folly" (after Brig.-Gen. William "Billy" Mitchell, who had championed the project), in 1927, the aircraft was disassembled by Air Service personnel and placed in storage at the Fairfield Air Depot. In 1929, then-Major Henry H. "Hap" Arnold was assigned as commander of the Fairfield Air Depot. He submitted a Report of Survey to the Office of the Chief of Air Corps, asking permission to salvage parts from the stored bomber, and burn the rest. Several members of Congress still held an interest in the aircraft, and the request was denied. Maj. Arnold then submitted a similar request to burn the "XNBL-1", omitting any mention of the name "Barling". That request was approved, and the bomber was burned at Fairfield in 1930.

Although the Barling Bomber was a failure, it introduced the use of large strategic bombers to the US military. Even Gen. "Hap" Arnold, who ordered it destroyed, later stated "if we look at it without bias, certainly [the Barling] had influence on the development of B-17s... and B-29s."

Surviving relics
One main tire and one nose tire from the bomber are on display at the National Museum of the United States Air Force in Dayton, Ohio. The tire's original B. F. Goodrich marking are still clearly visible.

Operators

United States Army Air Service

Specifications

See also

References
Notes

Bibliography

Allen, Francis J. "Flying Battleship: Walter H. Barling and the Wittemann-Lewis NBL-1". Air Enthusiast, No. 98, March/April 2002, pp. 66–73
Arnold, Henry H. Global Mission (Military Classics Series). New York: Tab Books, 1989, First edition 1949. 
"The Barling Bomber: An American Six-engined Giant." Flight, 13 February 1923, pp. 749–751
Cornelisse, Diana G. Home Field Advantage. Wright-Patterson Air Force Base, Ohio: U.S. Air Force Publications, 2004. 
Cornelisse, Diana G. Splendid Vision, Unswerving Purpose: Developing Air Power for the United States Air Force During the First Century of Powered Flight. Wright-Patterson Air Force Base, Ohio: U.S. Air Force Publications, 2002. 
Moy, Timothy. War Machines: Transforming Technologies in the U.S. Military, 1920–1940 (Texas A & M University Military History Series). College Station, Texas: Texas A&M University Press, 2001. 
Report on Official Performance Test of Barling Bomber, NLB-1, P-303, Light Load Configuration. McCook Field, Dayton, Ohio: Air Service Engineering Division, War Department, Flight Test Unit, Flight Research Branch, 14 April 1926
Swanborough, Gordon and Peter M. Bowers. United States Military Aircraft since 1909. London: Putnam, 1963
Tilford, Earl H., Jr. "The Barling Bomber." Aerospace Historian, June 1979, pp. 91–97
Winchester, Jim. The World's Worst Aircraft: From Pioneering Failures to Multimillion Dollar Disasters. London: Amber Books Ltd., 2005.

External links

Wittemann-Lewis NBL-1 "Barling Bomber" – USAF Museum
Maxwell AFB

NBL-1
1920s United States bomber aircraft
Triplanes
Six-engined push-pull aircraft
Cancelled military aircraft projects of the United States
Aircraft first flown in 1923